Jambar, is Densely populated area. It has two parts divided by a road one is  called Jambar Khurd"' and second as "'Jamber Kalan. Both are separate union councils. Few months back it was declared as town committee but recently town committee has been canceled into Union Council near Phoolnagar in Punjab, Pakistan. It is a part of Pattoki Tehsil in Kasur District. It has many public facilities like Basic Health Unit, Post Office, Girls and Boys High Schools and Telephone Exchange. Two scheduled banks HBL and BOP are operative here. Different private educational institutions are running by individuals. Rafiq Model School is well known and prominent as it is attached with Punjab Education Foundation providing free education to the needy students. In sports Cricket is major game but also football, volleyball and badminton.

Location

(Century paper & board mills) is near jamber.it is a progressing town.

Populated places in Kasur District